Meredith MacNeill (born 1975) is a Canadian actress and comedian. She is most famous for her roles in the sketch shows Man Stroke Woman and Baroness von Sketch Show, and the film Confetti.

Career 
In 2005, she appeared in series 3, episode 2 of Peep Show, playing the character of Mark and Jez's old friend from university, "Canadian" Merry. She promises Jez and Super Hans the disused pub she owns, and has a manic episode shortly afterwards.

She appears in the 2009 film Frequently Asked Questions About Time Travel as a time traveller called Millie.

In 2009, she appeared in production of Mary Stuart which played at the Traverse Theatre in Edinburgh and Linz in Austria.

She is the creator of Doreen George's My Travel Show.

She co-created and stars in the CBC Television 2016 comedy series Baroness von Sketch Show, and was awarded best actress at the 2015 Atlantic Film Festival for her role in the indie comedy Your Money or Your Wife. She is also a writer and frequent guest host for This Hour Has 22 Minutes.

At the 5th Canadian Screen Awards in 2017, MacNeill and her Baroness von Sketch Show castmates Aurora Browne, Carolyn Taylor and Jennifer Whalen were nominated for Best Ensemble Performance in a Variety or Sketch Comedy Series, and won the award for Best Writing in a Variety or Sketch Comedy Series; at the 6th Canadian Screen Awards in 2018, the troupe won the awards in both of the same categories.

In 2021 she appeared as a police detective in the Canadian drama series Pretty Hard Cases.

Personal life 
MacNeill is originally from Pictou County, Nova Scotia. She is a graduate of the Royal Academy of Dramatic Art.

Filmography

Film

Television

References

External links 
 

1975 births
21st-century Canadian actresses
Actresses from Nova Scotia
Alumni of RADA
Canadian comedy writers
Canadian people of Scottish descent
Canadian sketch comedians
Canadian television actresses
Canadian women comedians
Date of birth missing (living people)
Living people
This Hour Has 22 Minutes
People from Pictou County
Canadian television writers
Canadian Screen Award winners
Canadian women television writers
21st-century Canadian comedians
Comedians from Nova Scotia
Canadian Comedy Award winners